Selected Letters III (1929-1931) is a collection of letters by H. P. Lovecraft. It was released in 1971 by Arkham House in an edition of 2,513 copies.  It is the third of a five volume series of collections of Lovecraft's letters and includes a preface by August Derleth and Donald Wandrei.

Contents

Selected Letters III (1929-1931) includes letters to:

 Frank Belknap Long
 Woodburn Harris
 James Ferdinand Morton, Jr.
 Elizabeth Toldridge
 August Derleth
 Robert E. Howard

Reprints

2nd printing of 2,531 copies, 1997.

References

1971 non-fiction books
Arkham House books
Books published posthumously
Collections of letters
Non-fiction books by H. P. Lovecraft